Midhurst railway station used to serve the market town of Midhurst in the English county of West Sussex. The first railway to reach the town was a branch line from Petersfield opened by the London & South Western Railway on 1 September 1864.

The London Brighton and South Coast Railway (LBSCR) opened a separate station on 15 October 1866 when the line from Pulborough via Petworth was opened. It was resited in 1881 when a further line from Chichester in the south opened, also constructed by the LBSCR. This new station was designed by T. H. Myres in the LBSCR's 'Country House' design, which can still be seen at the preserved Bluebell Railway's stations. The station also had two signal boxes (although the Southern Railway closed one of these), while the original station continued to be used as a goods yard. An engine shed was also here but this was closed by the Southern Railway after 1923.

The former London & South Western Railway station closed in 1925 when services were diverted to the former LBSCR station.

The station closed to passengers after the last train on 5 February 1955, but freight services between Midhurst and Pulborough remained until 16 October 1964. The LBSCR station was demolished and the site is now under housing. The former L.S.W.R. station still survives and is now converted to offices.

Services  
Initially the line to Pulborough had five trains every weekday and two trains on Sunday, and this pattern continued as through trains when the line to Chichester opened, with one of the weekday trains being a through train from Victoria to Portsmouth.

All passenger services between Midurst and Chichester were withdrawn on 8 July 1935, leaving a through Pulborough to Petersfield service, of which there were ten trains on weekdays connecting at both ends with services to London. Sunday services in 1935 were six between Midhurst and Petersfield, but only 3 between Midhurst and Pulborough.

See also 
Midhurst (LSWR) railway station

References

External links 

 Midhusrt (LBSC) railway station on Subterranea Britannica.

Disused railway stations in West Sussex
Railway stations in Great Britain opened in 1866
Railway stations in Great Britain closed in 1964
Former London, Brighton and South Coast Railway stations
Thomas Myres buildings
1866 establishments in England
Midhurst